Flawlessly (1988–2002) was an American Thoroughbred race horse bred by Harbor View Farm.  She was a daughter of 1978 Triple Crown of Thoroughbred Racing champion Affirmed and La Confidence by Nijinsky II.

At two, she trained under Dick Dutrow, winning her first stakes victories, the Tempted Stakes and the Gardenia Stakes, both Grade III events.  She came third in the Grade I Frizette Stakes.  At three, she was sent to California to be trained by Charlie Whittingham.  With Wittingham, who chose her few races carefully, she won four turf stakes in a row.  By the end of her third year, she had won five stakes, including the Grade I Matriarch Stakes, the first of her three Matriarch victories. She also finished second in the Grade I Yellow Ribbon Stakes.

Flawlessly raced for five years, from age two to six. In each season except her first, she won at least one Grade I race.  Her campaigns earned her the North American distaff grass course championships of both 1992 and 1993.  At age five, she earned her largest purses, but even at six, she took her third Grade I Ramona Handicap.

Throughout her career, she won three runnings of the Grade I Matriarch, three runnings of the Ramona Handicap, and two of the Grade 1 Beverly Hills Handicap, in the process defeating the best of her generation: among them champion Hollywood Wildcat and the New Zealand-bred star Let’s Elope.

Flawlessly retired having earned nearly $2.6 million, a winning campaigner on both coasts as well as the Midwest.  Her 16 victories included 15 stakes races, eleven of them in graded company, and nine of them Grade 1.

Retirement

Flawlessly died of kidney problems on September 26, 2002, at the age of 14.  She was buried at Elmond Farm near Versailles, Kentucky. She was inducted into the Hall of Fame in 2004.

References
 "Champions, The Lives, Times, and Past Performances of America's Greatest Thoroughbreds, Champions from 1893-2004," Revised Edition (2005), by the Editors and Writers from the Daily Racing Form DRF Press 
 Flawlessly’s pedigree, racing stats, and photo
 Flawlessly in the Hall of Fame

1988 racehorse births
2002 racehorse deaths
Racehorses bred in Kentucky
Racehorses trained in the United States
United States Thoroughbred Racing Hall of Fame inductees
Thoroughbred family 2-d